Jean Brochard (12 March 1893 – 17 June 1972) was a French film actor. He appeared in more than 100 films between 1933 and 1966.

Selected filmography 

 A Man's Neck (1933) - Petit rôle (uncredited)
 Boubouroche (1933)
 La femme invisible (1933)
 Son autre amour (1934)
 Une femme chipée (1934)
 Minuit... place Pigalle (1934)
 Le diable en bouteille (1935)
 Les époux scandaleux (1935) - Un ouvrier
 Un soir de bombe (1935)
 Le secret de l'émeraude (1935) - Le sergent Irving
 Jonny, haute-couture (1935)
 Inspecteur Grey (1936) - L'inspecteur Poussin
 Bach the Detective (1936) - Le voyageur indisposé
 Tout va très bien madame la marquise (1936)
 The Mysterious Lady (1936)
 À minuit, le 7 (1937) - L'inspecteur Belenfant
 Vous n'avez rien à déclarer ? (1937) - Le balayeur
 À nous deux, madame la vie (1937)
 Champs-Elysees (1937) - Un agent
 The Cheat (1937) - Félicien
 Ma petite marquise (1937) - Godard
 La treizième enquête de Grey (1937) - L'inspecteur Poussin
 Les deux combinards (1938)
 Ramuntcho (1938) - Boulinguet
 Monsieur Breloque a disparu (1938)
 La Piste du sud (1938) - Adjudant Soulier
 Le capitaine Benoît (1938) - Mercadier
 Raphaël le tatoué (1939) - Le commissaire
 The White Slave (1939) - Le chef électricien (uncredited)
 Vidocq (1939) - Fanfan, le forçat repenti
 Nord-Atlantique (1939) - Daauphin - le patron
 Entente cordiale (1939) - Le valet
 La tradition de minuit (1939) - Le commissaire (uncredited)
 Berlingot and Company (1939)  - Le directeur de l'asile
 Frères corses (1939) - Le gendarme
 Ultima giovinezza (1939) - Il proprietario del ristorante
 Dernière Jeunesse (1939) - Le patron du restaurant
 La Loi du Nord (1939) - Urghard
 Personal Column (1939) - Le speaker
 Quartier sans soleil (1939) - Auguste
 Paradise Lost (1940) - Un soldat (uncredited)
 Miquette (1940)
 Bach en correctionnelle (1940) - L'agent de police
 L'enfer des anges (1941) - M. Petitot, le philatéliste
 Espoirs... (1941)
 The Acrobat (1941) - Le commissaire
 First Ball (1941) - Thomas
 Who Killed Santa Claus? (1942) - Ricomet
 Caprices (1942) - Le 'père'
 Le journal tombe à cinq heures (1942) - Meulon dit Borniol
 Les Roquevillard (1943) - Philippeaux
 Le Corbeau (1943) - Bonnevi - le trésorier de l'hôpital
 The Man from London (1943) - L'inspecteur Mollison
 Voyage Without Hope (1943) - L'inspecteur Chapelin
 Traveling Light (1944) - Marcel Berthier
 Cecile Is Dead (1944) - Dandurand
 La collection Ménard (1944) - Le guide
 Carmen (1944) - Lillas-Pastia
 Coup de tête (1944) - Le financier Brussac (uncredited)
 Vingt-quatre heures de perm (1945) - Le caporal
 Documents secrets (1945)
 La Grande Meute (1945) - Maître Marvault
 Boule de Suif (1945) - Auguste Loiseau
 The Last Judgment (1945) - Svodoba
 Jericho (1946) - Michaud
 A Lover's Return (1946) - Jérôme Nisard
 Le bateau à soupe (1946) - Le recruteur
 The Royalists (1947) - Marche-à-Terre
 La femme en rouge (1947) - Le commissaire
 La Maison sous la mer (1947) - Quoniam
 La dame d'onze heures (1948) - Le juge d'instruction
 La Carcasse et le Tord-cou (1948) - Me Souquet
 Scandals of Clochemerle (1948) - Piéchut
 Night Express (1948) - L'inspecteur Verdier
 Wench (1948) - Rabasse
 Five Red Tulips (1949) - L'inspecteur-chef Honoré Ricoul
 Barry (1949) - Philémon Cavazza
 Return to Life (1949) - L'hôtelier (segment 3 : "Le retour de Jean")
 Mademoiselle de La Ferté (1949) - Monsieur Larald
 Vient de paraître (1949) - Brégaillon
 Millionaires for One Day (1949) - Pierre Berger
 Sending of Flowers (1950) - Hippolyte
 Bed for Two; Rendezvous with Luck (1950) - M. Gauffre
 God Needs Men (1950) - L'abbé Kerhervé, le recteur de Lescoff
 Under the Sky of Paris (1951) - Jules Hermenault
 Dr. Knock (1951) - Docteur Albert Parpalaid
 Passion (1951) - Le directeur de la prison
 The Voyage to America (1951) - Le maire
 Tapage nocturne (1951) - Frédéric Varescot
 La forêt de l'adieu (1952) - Edouard Queyrian
 Monsieur Taxi (1952) - Oncle Léon
 Crimson Curtain (1952) - L'inspecteur en chef
 Cent ans de gloire (1952)
 Des quintuplés au pensionnat (1953) - Florentin
 Capitaine Pantoufle (1953) - Monsieur Lesurpied
 I Vitelloni (1953) - Francesco Moretti
 The Lady of the Camellias (1953) - Le notaire
 Piédalu député (1954) - Coldagneau
 The Lovers of Marianne (1954) - Le chef-comptable Jean Berton
 Les Diaboliques (1955) - Plantiveau, le concierge
 L'impossible Monsieur Pipelet (1955) - Monsieur Richet
 The Maiden (1955) - Le commissaire Alphandri
 Thirteen at the Table (1955) - Dr. Pelourzat
 Le secret de soeur Angèle (1956) - Le speaker
 Les mains liées (1956) - Dr. Diriart
 The Virtuous Bigamist (1956) - Le commerçant dans le car
 I'll Get Back to Kandara (1956) - Le juge d'instruction
 Ah, quelle équipe! (1957) - Le prêtre
 Les violents (1957) - Bernard Chartrain
 Les Espions (1957) - Le surveillant-général
 Lovers of Paris (1957) - Duveyrier
 Sinners of Paris (1958) - Le commissaire divisionnaire Brevet, de la P.J.
 The Law Is the Law (1958) - Le député
 La bête à l'affût (1959) - Commissaire François
 An Angel on Wheels (1959) - Le père de Line
 The Enigma of the Folies-Bergere (1959)
 Way of Youth (1959) - Monsieur Coutelier
 À pleines mains (1960) - Le commissaire Marsay

References

External links

1893 births
1972 deaths
French male film actors
20th-century French male actors